Dyckia ferox is a plant species in the genus Dyckia. This species is native to Mato Grosso, Argentina, Bolivia, and Paraguay.

References

ferox
Flora of South America
Plants described in 1896